The Wolf WD1, also known as the Wolf-Dallara WD1, was a sports prototype race car, designed, developed, and built by British-Canadian constructor, Walter Wolf Racing, in partnership with Italian manufacturer, constructor, and design company, Dallara, for the revived Can-Am series, in 1977. It was driven by Chris Amon and Gilles Villeneuve. Its best result was a 3rd-place podium finish, at Road America in 1977; being driven by Villeneuve. As with most Can-Am cars of the time, it was powered by the commonly used  Chevrolet small-block engine.

References

Sports prototypes
Can-Am cars 
Open wheel racing cars
Formula Three cars